NH 12 may refer to:

 National Highway 12 (India)
 New Hampshire Route 12, United States